Abul Kashem Fazlul Haq (born 30 September 1940) is a Bangladeshi writer, essayist, translator, critic, columnist and activist. He is a former professor of Bengali language and literature at the University of Dhaka. He is the convener of Rashtrabhasha Bangla Rokkha Komiti (রাষ্ট্রভাষা বাংলা রক্ষা কমিটি, State Language Bengali Protection Committee). He received Bangla Academy Literary Award in 1981.

Early life 
He was born in Pakundia, Kishoreganj, Bangladesh. His father Muhammad Abdul Hakim, mother Jahanara Khatun and his wife Farida Pradhan.

Abul Kashem Fazlul Haq passed the Entrance Examination from Mymensingh Zilla School in 1959. In 1961, he passed the Higher Secondary Certificate in Science from Ananda Mohan College. He graduated from Dhaka University in 1965 and completed his post-graduation from the same university in 1966.  While studying at Dhaka University, he came in contact with Munir Chowdhury, Ahmed Sharif, Humayun Azad, Nilima Ibrahim and was introduced to progressive ideas.

Career 
Haq was a faculty member of the Department of Bengali at the University of Dhaka for four decades. He has been editing the literary magazine called Lokayata since 1982.

Selected bibliography 
 Muktir Sangram (মুক্তিসংগ্রাম, 1972)
Kaler Jatrar Dhwani (কালের যাত্রার ধ্বনি, 2004)
Ekushe February Andolon (একুশে ফেব্রআরি আন্দোলন, 1976)
Manush o Tar Poribesh (মানুষ ও তার পরিবেশ, 1988)
Sahityacinta (সাহিত্যচিন্তা, 1995)
Rajniti o Dorshon (রাজনীতি ও দর্শন, 1989)
Bangladesher Rajnitite Buddhijibider Bhumika (বাঙলাদেশের রাজনীতিতে বুদ্ধিজীবীদের ভূমিকা, 1997)
Unish Shataker Modhyashreni o Bangla Sahitya (উনিশশতকের মধ্যশ্রেণি ও বাঙলা সাহিত্য, 1979)
Mao Setunger Gyantattwa (মাও সেতুঙের জ্ঞানতত্ত্ব, 1987)
Sahitya o Sangskriti Prosonge (সাহিত্য ও সংস্কৃতি প্রসঙ্গে, 2002)
Shreshtha Prabandha (শ্রেষ্ঠ প্রবন্ধ, 2011)

Translations 
 Rajnoitik Adarsha (রাজনৈতিক আদর্শ, 1972), a translation of Bertrand Russell's Political Ideals
Nobojuger Protthyasha (নবযুগের প্রত্যাশায়, 1989), a translation of Bertrand Russell's New Hopes for a Changing World

Editor 
 Lokayata

Awards 
 Bangla Academy Literary Award (1981)

References 

Bangladeshi essayists
Bangladeshi Marxists
Living people
Recipients of Bangla Academy Award
1944 births
20th-century Bangladeshi philosophers
Bangladeshi translators